Ostrov u Macochy is a market town in Blansko District in the South Moravian Region of the Czech Republic. It has about 1,100 inhabitants.

References

Populated places in Blansko District
Market towns in the Czech Republic